Yñigo is a surname of Basque origin in Eneko (Ennekwo), found primarily in the Basque region of Spain and France. This word may refer to:

Origin
The last name Yñigo (or Iñigo) has its origins in the Basque Country.

Meaning
Usually surnames were originated in the Basque Country as name of houses, being families known by the name of the house they inhabited once. Yñigo was originally spelled Eneko and evolved from the Basque words ene, which means 'my', and ko, which means 'little'. Therefore, Yñigo means 'my little (love/dear)'.

Variation
Confusion has arisen through changes over time. Eneko or Enneco change to: Einygo, lamented, Endego, Enec, Eneco, Eneg, Enego, Enegot, Éneq, Enyego, Enyeguez, Enyégues, Ennego, Ennygo, Eynigo, Henego, Henneco, Inego, Inigo, Innago, Iñaki, Iñigo, Iniguez, Íñiquiz, Migo, Ñiguez, Yeniego, Yenigo, Yeniguez, Ynigo, Ynyéguez, Ýñigo, Yñigo, Yniguez and Yñiquiz. These variants are disseminated throughout the Hispanic world.

Coat of arms and nobility
Over the centuries, there have been many different coat of arms associated with this surname. At the "Consejo Real de Navarra", "Real Chancillería de Granada", "Real Chancillería de Valladolid", "Real Compañía de Guardias Marinas", "Real Audiencia de Oviedo" and in the following orders "Order of Alcantara", "Order of Calatrava", "Order of Charles III", "Order of Montesa", "Order of Saint Lazarus" and "Order of Santiago" there are different records for this surname amongst other "Expedientes de Hidalguía" held in their archive. Which are open for public use, genealogists and family historians.

People
Yñigo is a surname of Basque origin.

 Lope Yñigo (1969), Mexican land tenure

References

External links 

Surnames
Basque-language surnames